18if is a Japanese anime television series produced by Gonzo. It aired from July 7 to September 29, 2017.

It is part of the media franchise The Art of 18, which also includes a smartphone game by Mobcast titled  for Android and iOS.

Summary
Haruto Tsukishiro wakes up in a dream world dominated by strange and powerful entities called "Witches". To survive, he gets the assistance of research professor Katsumi Kanzaki and a mysterious white-haired girl called "Lily". With their help, Haruto must outsmart the witches and find a way to return to the real world.

Characters

Protagonists

Haruto was trapped in the dream world and worked with Lily and Professor Kanzaki, trying to return to the real world. At the end of the anime, it was revealed that in truth, Haruto was in an accident of unknown origin (Even Haruto himself did not remember it) and had been in a coma for years. In the end, Haruto left with the reformed Eve through the door to God's Domain, while his body in the waking world dies. The finale implies he was Eve's long-lost Adam.

A scientist who investigates the dream world. Kanzaki saw Haruto's journey as an opportunity to further his research. He had a second agenda: His younger sister, Yurina, was a victim of Sleeping Beauty Syndrome, and while working to research the dream world as well as Haruto, he was trying to awaken her. Inside the dream world, Kanzaki takes the form of an anthropomorphic cat.

A mysterious girl Haruto met inside the dream world. For some reason, only Haruto can see her until episode 10 onwards, when Katsumi is able to see and hear her though the use of special glasses. At the end of the anime, it is revealed that Lily's true identity is Eve, or rather the Aspect of Eve before she was corrupted by eating from the Tree of Knowledge. She merges with Eve at the end of the series and leaves for God's Domain with Haruto.

Witches

The first Witch Haruto encounters in the dream world. Nicknamed the "Witch of Thunder", Yuko uses Haruto for her games and attempts to kill him when he refuses. With Lily's help, Haruto realizes Yuko is actually a girl who had her heart broken after a cruel joke and went to the dream world to escape from her problems. Haruto helps Yuko move on from her suffering and allows her to return to the real world.

The second Witch Haruto encounters in the dream world. A survivor of a brutal home invasion/murder while she was 12, she wishes to bring justice to the three who killed her family who died protecting her even though she feels she did not deserve their affection. When facing the third killer (the brains), Haruto steps in and kills him as he discovers he was the most dangerous of the three. She wakes up wanting to meet her protector in the real world when she gets out of the hospital.

The third Witch Haruto encounters in the dream world. A terminally sick girl who desires to live a normal highschool life, but unable to do so due to her bad health and terminal stage, cursing her own state. Haruto encounters her in the dream world and the two enjoy normal life, affairs such as shopping or playing. She falls in love with Haruto and passes away grateful to him. Later on, it's revealed that a part of her soul remained behind in concern for Haruto. Kayo is key in finding Haruto's comatose body and finding out the truth behind his state. She and the other 10 witches return to help him save Eve's soul. She is also called the "Witch of First Love".

The fourth Witch Haruto encounters in the dream world. An amateur model who was dumped by her boyfriend over a slimmer underclassman model. She develops an unhealthy relationship with food, becoming bulimic following the event, putting her love of food against keeping a better figure at odds. Through Haruto's help, she's able to regain her joy of eating food normally and seeks a new love in Haruto. She is also called the "Witch of Gluttony".

The fifth Witch Haruto encounters in the dream world.

The sixth Witch Haruto encounters in the dream world.

The seventh Witch Haruto encounters in the dream world.

The eighth Witch Haruto encounters in the dream world.

The ninth Witch Haruto encounters in the dream world.

The tenth Witch Haruto encounters in the dream world.

Katsumi's sister and the final Witch Haruto encounters in the dream world. A friend put her into an audition and as a result, she became a very famous idol, to the point that Misaki has stated that Yurina is the idol that she herself wanted to become. However, the pressures of stardom had worn her down until she was struck down with Sleeping Beauty Syndrome and chosen to be Eve's protector.

Others

The primary antagonist of the series. After exiled from Paradise, Eve fell into a deep slumber that led to the creation of the modern world. Her awakening threatens to destroy mankind, which she considers to be revenge against God for exiling her. The Witches are able to talk her out of destroying the world and she recognizes Lily as an alternate version of herself that didn't eat the forbidden fruit. After merging with Lily and becoming whole, she departs with Haruto into Heaven.

Anime
18if is a Japanese anime television series produced by Gonzo. It aired from July 7 to September 29, 2017. Kōji Morimoto served as chief supervisor. Each episode featured a different director. Atsuhiro Tomioka handled the series composition, Hiroko Kazui served as design director, and Tadashi Oppata designed the characters. Ryūdai Abe composed the music. The opening theme is "Red Doors feat. Yoshikazu Mera" by TeddyLoid. The series is licensed by Funimation in North America. Crunchyroll streamed the anime.

Notes

References

External links
 

2017 anime television series debuts
Funimation
Gonzo (company)